Mobolaji Yemisi Adekunle-Oniyo, (born October 31, 1981), popularly known as Psalmos, is a Nigerian gospel singer, praise and worship leader and a songwriter who rose to prominence following the release of her hit song "Oluwa ku'se" featuring Kore, since then, Psalmos has ministered in a number of churches across Nigeria and UK, including Gloryhouse church in London.

Early life and career
Psalmos was born in Ekiti State Nigeria, Psalmos is the last born of six children. In her words "I attended Community High School, Ojodu Abiodu, Berger, Lagos State and proceeded to the University of Ado Ekiti, where I obtained a diploma in Banking and Finance, then went ahead to study Industrial Relations and Personnel Management and graduated with a B.Sc from the Lagos State University" https://tribuneonlineng.com/having-husband-who-is-a-music-producer-makes-things-easier-psalmos/

Psalmos worked as a banker for three years at Reliance Bank, the bank traces its origins back to 1989 when Prudent Bank Plc., was incorporated as a limited liability company. In 1990, the bank was issued a license as merchant bank. That same year, it re-branded as Prudent Merchant Bank Limited. In 2006, Prudent Merchant Bank Limited merged with four other banks to form Skye Bank Plc:[6]
•	Bond Bank Limited
•	EIB International Bank Plc.
•	Reliance Bank Limited
•	Co-operative Bank Plc.

Psalmos also worked in an aluminium company and Avion Travels. She became a music minister after she joined the choir in Christ Livingspring Apostolic Ministry (CLAM) in 2004. "I have always loved singing from when I was a kid but I didn’t start from my mother’s womb like some will say. As a child, I recall holding a ruler in front of the mirror, singing and dancing. In her words, I was told by several people at the same time that I’m a vessel used by God, I also knew that there was more to me than singing in the choir and at the appointed time, the Lord made it happen. Psalmos has released a number of albums and they have all been from one level of glory to another. The first one was Higher Ground, the second was Expression of His Goodness and after that was Emmanuel. Psalmos had her concert in August 2019 and it was an awesome atmosphere in the presence of God, worshipping God has always been Psalmos desire." https://www.youtube.com/watch?v=9sRfu1D4Agw&ab_channel=PSALMOSIYUNADEInstrumentOfWorship
Psalmos has also been releasing a lot of new songs at different intervals including – Jesu Joba ft Tope Alabi, Dancehall, Oku Itoju mi, Miracle Working God, Odara, Orin Titun, Big God, Chairman, Mogbagbo, Emmanuel and Agame. Psalmos is working on releasing other singles in the months to come.
https://tribuneonlineng.com/having-husband-who-is-a-music-producer-makes-things-easier-psalmos/

Parental background
I am from a broken home and I stayed with my mum after she separated from my dad. However, at the time I started music, I had already lost my mum. So, when I wanted to quit my job at the bank, I didn’t have to ask for anybody’s permission

The price of being a celebrity
According Psalmos "The price of not being able to express myself in public but it has become a life style so I don’t have to complain." https://tribuneonlineng.com/having-husband-who-is-a-music-producer-makes-things-easier-psalmos/

Music ministers as entertainers
"It takes a personal experience and a walk with the Holy Spirit to determine whether you will be a minister of the Gospel or an entertainer. It is your level of understanding and willingness that will determine whether you will be a music minister or an entertainer" https://tribuneonlineng.com/having-husband-who-is-a-music-producer-makes-things-easier-psalmos/

Philosophy of life
Psalmos philosophy of life is Live a life of purpose, create your happiness and love always
https://tribuneonlineng.com/having-husband-who-is-a-music-producer-makes-things-easier-psalmos/

Marriage

Psalmos is married to her Music Producer, Dekunle Oniyo according to Psalmos, her marriage has been wonderful. It is a lot more convenient when you are married to your producer; it makes the work easier for you. Also, I thank God because he is an understanding man, we go out together and come back late at night. He understands whenever I tell him that I am tired. It is not easy doing music and raising young children. If I had married someone who doesn’t understand the music business, it would have been very difficult for us.

Motherhood
Psalmos waited for seven years (after marriage) before she gave birth to her first child, according to Psalmos It wasn’t a good experience but at the end of it all, I am grateful to God for coming through for me. My waiting period was very challenging because as a gospel minister, I go out to minister to people and they get blessed while I come back and lay on my bed, either crying or thinking about the fact that I don’t have children. I prayed, fasted and did all I could but it didn’t come on time. At a point, I got tired of asking God for a child, especially when I observed my menstrual cycle. Pressure from family members was also overwhelming but my husband kept on encouraging me with his reassuring love.

Leisure
When Psalmos is not singing, she would stay at home and spend time with her family and read literatures.

Fashion
Psalmos prefer simple dress, she loves wearing her boots, according to Psalmos, I love to wear boots but I don’t get to wear them often because I can’t show up in a church looking like a rock star.

Discography
Psalmos focuses on African tunes, No matter the song I work on, I will always put a touch of my mother tongue in it.
The song that brought Psalmos to the limelight was Ku ishe featuring Kenny K’ore. It is a remix of an old Ekiti song. At that time, Psalmos had recently lost her mum and she missed her so much. So, she decided to do the song that she loved singing.

Studio albums
Ku ishe featuring Kenny K’ore 
 Jesu Joba featuring Tope Alabi
 Oku Itoju mi
 Miracle Working God
 Orin Titun 
 Odara
 Big God 
 Mogbagbo 
 Emmanuel 
 Agame 
Kos'Oba Bire (ft. Tope Alabi)

Live albums
Psalmos has been part of various live recordings including her live concert in August 2019, and at various churches and live DVD recording event across the years.

References

 https://punchng.com/being-married-to-my-producer-has-made-my-job-easier-mobolaji-olayinka-psalmos/
https://tribuneonlineng.com/having-husband-who-is-a-music-producer-makes-things-easier-psalmos/
https://financial-message.club/lp/edchargin/lp4/?tag=66100&tag1=software_udate&tag2=15243677&tag3=66100&tag4=dating&clickid=07f6368a24324993e1e6d1785a38516e-4888-1120&device=Desktop&brand=Desktop&model=Desktop&country=GB&affid=66100&subid=15243677&ln=en&cid=%7Bsk%7D&useragent=%7Bvar:useragent%7D&ip=&bv=Chrome%2086&as=pc
https://afrikalyrics.com/artist/psalmos
https://www.youtube.com/watch?v=LpbpXqe5bVk&ab_channel=PSALMOSIYUNADEInstrumentOfWorship
https://www.youtube.com/watch?v=9sRfu1D4Agw&t=2270s&ab_channel=PSALMOSIYUNADEInstrumentOfWorship
https://www.youtube.com/watch?v=-4H8KFcTYpg&ab_channel=todhouseoffavor
https://gloryhouse.org.uk/

Nigerian songwriters
Nigerian gospel singers
1981 births
Living people
21st-century Nigerian singers